Corrosion of Conformity is the eighth studio album by American heavy metal band Corrosion of Conformity, released on February 28, 2012 by Candlelight Records. It is the band's first album since In the Arms of God (2005), their longest gap to date between studio albums. It is also their first album with Reed Mullin on drums since 2000's America's Volume Dealer and the first to not feature Pepper Keenan on vocals or guitar since 1987's Technocracy.

Track listing

Personnel
 Woody Weatherman – guitar, vocals
 Mike Dean – bass, vocals
 Reed Mullin – drums, percussion

References

Corrosion of Conformity albums
2012 albums